Iron River is a town in Bayfield County, Wisconsin, United States. The population was 1,123 at the 2010 census. The census-designated place of Iron River is located in the town. The unincorporated community of Topside is also located in the town.

Geography

Demographics
At the 2000 census, there were 1,059 people, 485 households and 311 families residing in the town. The racial make-up was 96.79% White, 1.32% Native American, 0.57% Asian, and 1.32% from two or more races. Hispanic or Latino of any race were 0.38% of the population.

There were 485 households, of which 23.1% had children under the age of 18 living with them, 51.3% were married couples living together, 6.8% had a female householder with no husband present, and 35.7% were non-families. 30.9% of all households were made up of individuals, and 16.5% had someone living alone who was 65 years of age or older. The average household size was 2.18 and the average family size was 2.68.

19.9% of the population were under the age of 18, 6.0% from 18 to 24, 22.9% from 25 to 44, 28.0% from 45 to 64, and 23.0% who were 65 years of age or older. The median age was 46 years. For every 100 females, there were 98.7 males. For every 100 females age 18 and over, there were 95.8 males.

The median household income was $28,796 and the median family income was $36,597. Males had a median income of $30,060 and females $18,125. The per capita income was $16,449. About 10.2% of families and 15.4% of the population were below the poverty line, including 28.2% of those under age 18 and 12.4% of those age 65 or over.

Arts and culture

Blueberry Festival
The Iron River Lion's Club sponsors the annual Blueberry Festival at Moon Lake Park in July. The festival includes rides, crafts, food and games.

Bayfield County Fair
The Bayfield County Fair takes place annually in August and includes grandstand shows, exhibitions and carnival rides.

Education
Iron River Public Schools belong to the Maple School District. There are two elementary schools, a middle school and a high school in the district. Students attend Northwestern High School.

Infrastructure

Transportation
 U.S. Highway 2 serves as a main route in the community. Other routes include County Highways A and H.

References

External links
Town of Iron River official website
Iron River Area Chamber of Commerce
Iron River Lions Club
Iron River Pike Chain of Lakes Association, Inc
Sanborn fire insurance maps: 1893 1898 1904 1917

Towns in Bayfield County, Wisconsin
Towns in Wisconsin

es:Iron River (Wisconsin)